Gene banks are a type of biorepository that preserves genetic material. For plants, this is done by in vitro storage, freezing cuttings from the plant, or stocking the seeds (e.g. in a seedbank). For animals, this is done by the freezing of sperm and eggs in zoological freezers until further need. With corals, fragments are taken and stored in water tanks under controlled conditions. Genetic material in a 'gene bank' is preserved in a variety of ways, such as freezing at -196° Celsius in liquid nitrogen, being placed in artificial ecosystems, and  put in controlled nutrient mediums.

Accession is the common term given to an individual sample in a gene bank, such as a distinct species or variety.

In plants, it is possible to unfreeze the material and propagate it. However, in animals, a living female is required for artificial insemination. While it is often difficult to use frozen animal sperm and eggs, there are many examples of it being done successfully.

In an effort to conserve agricultural biodiversity, gene banks are used to store and conserve the plant genetic resources of major crop plants and their crop wild relatives. There are many gene banks all over the world, with the Svalbard Global Seed Vault being considered the most famous one.

The database of the largest gene banks in the world can be queried via a common website, Genesys. A number of global gene banks are coordinated by the CGIAR Genebank Platform

Types of gene banks

Seed bank 
A seed bank preserves dried seeds by storing them at a very low temperature. Spores and pteridophytes are conserved in seed banks, but other seedless plants, such as tuber crops, cannot be preserved this way. The largest seed bank in world is the Millennium Seed Bank housed at the Wellcome Trust Millennium Building (WTMB), located in the grounds of Wakehurst Place in West Sussex, near London.

In vitro bank
In this technique, buds, protocorm and meristematic cells are preserved through particular light and temperature arrangements in a nutrient medium, which is either jellified or in liquid form. This technique is used to preserve seedless plants and plants that reproduce asexually or that require preservation as clones such as commercial cultivars.

Cryobank
In this technique, a seed or embryo is preserved at very low temperatures. It is usually preserved in liquid nitrogen at -196 °C. This is helpful for the conservation of species facing extinction. Cryobanks are utilized for the cryoconservation of animal genetic resources

Storage of pollen 
This is a method in which pollen grains are stored. Using this technique, plants with one set of chromosomes can be made. The pollen is stored in liquid nitrogen. This method is useful for crossbreeding.

Field gene bank 
This is a method of planting plants for the conservation of genes. For this purpose, an ecosystem is created artificially. Through this method, one can compare the differences among plants of different species and can study them in detail. It needs more land, adequate soil, weather, etc. Germplasm of important crops are conserved through this method. 42,000 varieties of rice are conserved in the Central Rice Research Institute in Orissa.

See also 
 Sperm bank
 Ova bank
 Biobank
 Biological database
 Germplasm
 Seed bank
 Plant genetic resources
 Multi-Crop Passport Descriptor (MCPD)

References 

 
  174 p.
  147 p.

External links 
 AEGIS A European Genebank Integrated System
 The Crop Genebank Knowledge Base
  Genebanks
 Genesys
 DAD-IS: Domestic Animal Diversity Information System